Outardes-2 is a hydroelectric power station and dam on the Outardes River  southwest of Baie-Comeau, Quebec, Canada. The power station was commissioned in 1978 and is run-of-the-river.

Outardes-2 was built in conjunction with the Manicouagan-Outardes project and is located at the mouth of the Outardes River by Noye Bay. Just west of the power station was another that had been owned and operated by the Quebec North Shore Paper Company  since 1937. Instead of raising the reservoir as initially envisioned, Outardes-2 was constructed to better exploit the river flow.

See also

 Outardes-3
 Outardes-4
 McCormick Dam
 Jean-Lesage generating station
 René-Lévesque generating station
 Daniel-Johnson Dam
 History of Hydro-Québec
 List of hydroelectric stations in Quebec

Notes

References
 .

Energy infrastructure completed in 1978
Manicouagan-Outardes hydroelectric project
Run-of-the-river power stations
Baie-Comeau
Publicly owned dams in Canada